Kaczmarczyk is a surname. Notable people with the surname include:

 Rafał Kaczmarczyk (born 1972), a retired Polish professional footballer
 Zdzisław Kaczmarczyk (1911–1980), a Polish historian

See also
 Judith Kaczmarczyk Nerat (1948–2012), a Democratic politician and member of the Michigan State House of Representatives
 Wanda Fukała-Kaczmarczyk (born 1935), a Polish fencer

Polish-language surnames